Torovo is a small settlement in the Municipality of Vodice in the Upper Carniola region of Slovenia. The main motorway from Ljubljana to Jesenice passes east of the settlement and towards the north a dense forest extends to Voglje.

References

External links
Torovo on Geopedia

Populated places in the Municipality of Vodice